AAK, formerly AarhusKarlshamn, is a global Sweden-based company and producer of vegetable oils and fats.

History 
The company, formerly known as AarhusKarlshamn, was founded in 2005 through the merger of Karlshamns AB (founded 1918 in Karlshamn, Sweden) and Aarhus United A/S (founded 1871 in Aarhus, Denmark).

Company 
The company has been listed, as the current legal entity, on the Stockholm Stock Exchange (OMX) since 2005 and had a total market cap of about 50,2 billion SEK, as of April 30, 2021. As of December 31, 2021, the group had a total turnover of 35,452 million SEK, an operating profit of 2,393 million SEK, and 4,013 employees globally.

Production facilities 
The group has production facilities in numerous countries with its main production units situated in:

 Runcorn, United Kingdom
 Villavicencio, Colombia
 Louisville, United States
 Jundiaí, Brazil
 Zhangjiagang, China
   Richmond (CA), United States
 Khopoli, India
   Aarhus, Denmark
   Hull, United Kingdom
   Karlshamn, Sweden
   Montevideo, Uruguay
   Morelia, Mexico
   Newark (NJ), United States
   Zaandijk, The Netherlands
   Merksem, Belgium
 Dalby, Sweden
   Hillside (NJ), United States
 Rotterdam, The Netherlands
St Leonards-on-Sea, United Kingdom

Products 
The company's products are used in a wide variety of applications in the food, confectionery, pharmaceutical, cosmetic, chemical and animal feed industries.

Awards and recognitions 
In 2021, AAK was named world's second top specialty oil company by the Chinese food media FoodTalks.

See also 
 List of Swedish companies

References

External links 

 Official website

Companies based in Malmö
Palm oil
Agriculture companies established in 2005
Companies listed on Nasdaq Stockholm
Food and drink companies of Sweden
Palm oil companies
Swedish companies established in 2005